Marilyn Priscilla Johnson (June 19, 1922 – September 19, 2022) was an American diplomat who served as United States Ambassador to Togo. She was appointed to that position on September 23, 1978, and left her post on July 29, 1981.

She graduated from Radcliffe College with a B.A. in 1944 and from Middlebury College in 1952 with an M.A. She enlisted in the U.S. Navy from 1944 to 1946.

From 1952 and 1959, Johnson taught French at high schools. Between 1962 and 1964, she taught English as a foreign language in various schools inside Cameroon and Mali. She joined the Foreign Service in 1964, and was a cultural affairs officer in Bamako, Mali, and Tunis, Tunisia, as well as public affairs officer in Niamey, Niger.

From 1971 to 1974, Johnson was the Deputy Assistant Director of the Information Centers Program. The following year, she attended the Senior Seminar in Foreign Policy, and from 1975 to 1976 she learned Russian through training. In 1976 she was  cultural affairs officer in Moscow, Soviet Union. In September 1978 she was assigned as United States Ambassador to the Republic of Togo until July 1981.

Johnson died at her home in Bethlehem, New Hampshire, on September 19, 2022, at the age of 100.

References

1922 births
2022 deaths
People from Boston
Ambassadors of the United States to Togo
Radcliffe College alumni
American women ambassadors
Middlebury College alumni
United States Foreign Service personnel
United States Navy personnel of World War II
American women in World War II
Female United States Navy personnel
Military personnel from Massachusetts
American high school teachers
American expatriates in Cameroon
American expatriates in Mali
American expatriates in Tunisia
American expatriates in Niger
American expatriates in the Soviet Union
21st-century American women
American centenarians
Women centenarians